John Christopher Baillie Papaloizou FRS (born 1947) is a British theoretical physicist. Papaloizou is a professor at the Department of Applied Mathematics and Theoretical Physics (DAMTP) at the University of Cambridge. He works on the theory of accretion disks, with particular application to the formation of planets. He received his D.Phil. in 1972 from the University of Sussex under the supervision of Roger J. Tayler. The title of his thesis is The Vibrational Instability in Massive Stars.

He discovered the Papaloizou-Pringle instability together with Jim Pringle in 1984. Papaloizou also made major contributions in various areas such as the radial-orbit instability, toroidal modes in stars and different instabilities in accretion disks.

The asteroid 17063 Papaloizou is named after John Papaloizou.

Awards
2003 Fellow of the Royal Society

References

External links
 Astrophysical Fluid Dynamics and Non-linear Patterns - Group Home Page

1947 births
Astronomers at the University of Cambridge
Alumni of Queen Mary University of London
Alumni of the University of Sussex
20th-century British astronomers
English physicists
English people of Greek descent
Living people
Cambridge mathematicians
Fellows of the Royal Society
Theoretical physicists